The 2006 Nova Scotia general election was held on June 13, 2006 to elect members of the 60th House of Assembly of the Province of Nova Scotia, Canada.

Premier Rodney MacDonald, who led a Progressive Conservative minority government in the legislature, called for the election on May 13, 2006, hoping for a majority government to better advance his agenda and a clear mandate for himself as he had not yet fought an election as leader.

Ultimately, MacDonald was returned to power leading another, slightly smaller, minority government against a strengthened New Democratic Party sitting as the Official Opposition and a weakened Liberal Party. Liberal leader Francis MacKenzie was defeated in his riding of Bedford.

Timeline 
September 29, 2005 - Premier John Hamm, leader of the Progressive Conservative minority government, announces his intent to resign as soon as the party chooses a new leader.
February 11, 2006 - Rodney MacDonald is elected to replace Hamm as leader.
February 24, 2006 - MacDonald becomes Premier and his cabinet is sworn in.
May 9, 2006 - MacDonald's government introduces an "election-style" budget in the legislature.
May 13, 2006 - Premier Rodney MacDonald calls a general election for June 13, 2006.

Campaign
MacKenzie was an outspoken critic of the governing Tories and accused them of living in a "fantasy world" due to their promise to cut taxes and increase spending in the 2006-07 budget.

No single issue dominated the election campaign, with all parties offering up various promises for university students to seniors.

Results

The Progressive Conservatives gained several points in the popular vote, but made a net loss of two seats, with losses to the NDP partially countered by the PCs doubling their representation on MacDonald's native Cape Breton Island at the expense of the Liberals. The gap between the Liberals and NDP also significantly increased, in both the popular vote and seat count; while the Liberals and NDP had previously been nearly even, the NDP gained a significant advantage on the Liberals and moved into position as the primary opposition to the governing PCs.

Results by party

* The Green Party did not contest the 2003 election.

Results by region

Retiring incumbents
Progressive Conservative
Ron Russell, Hants West
Cecil O'Donnell, Shelburne
Bill Langille, Colchester North
Peter G. Christie, Bedford
John Hamm, Pictou Centre
Jim DeWolfe, Pictou East

New Democratic
Jerry Pye, Dartmouth North

Independent
Russell MacKinnon, Cape Breton West

Nominated candidates
Legend
bold denotes party leader
† denotes an incumbent who is not running for re-election or was defeated in nomination contest

Valley

|-
|bgcolor=whitesmoke|Annapolis
|
|Blair Hannam2,04124.57%
|
|Calum MacKenzie1,39116.75%
||
|Stephen McNeil4,66856.20%
|
|Ken McGowan2062.48%
|
|
||
|Stephen McNeil
|-
|bgcolor=whitesmoke|Clare
|
|Arnold LeBlanc1,62228.08%
|
|Paul Comeau1,26921.97%
||
|Wayne Gaudet2,80348.53%
|
|Diane Doucet-Bean821.42%
|
|
||
|Wayne Gaudet
|-
|bgcolor=whitesmoke|Digby—Annapolis
|
|Jimmy MacAlpine2,17036.42%
|
|Andrew Oliver66311.13%
||
|Harold Theriault3,03450.91%
|
|Namron Bean921.54%
|
|
||
|Harold Theriault
|-
|bgcolor=whitesmoke|Hants West
||
|Chuck Porter2,96934.60%
|
|Sean Bennett2,48628.97%
|
|Paula Lunn2,92434.08%
|
|Sam Schurman2012.34%
|
|
||
|Ron Russell†
|-
|bgcolor=whitesmoke|Kings North
||
|Mark Parent4,15350.07%
|
|Jim Morton2,19026.40%
|
|Madonna Spinazola1,75721.18%
|
|Christopher Alders1952.35%
|
|
||
|Mark Parent
|-
|bgcolor=whitesmoke|Kings South
||
|David Morse3,78842.37%
|
|David Mangle3,13035.01%
|
|Ray Savage1,79720.10%
|
|Steven McGowan2262.53%
|
|
||
|David Morse
|-
|bgcolor=whitesmoke|Kings West
|
|John Prall2,80133.18%
|
|Greg Hubbert1,59018.83%
||
|Leo Glavine3,94046.67%
|
|Nistal Prem de Boer1121.33%
|
|
||
|Leo Glavine
|}

South Shore

|-
|bgcolor=whitesmoke|Argyle
||
|Chris d'Entremont3,15867.65%
|
|Charles Muise53111.38%
|
|Christian Surette91319.56%
|
|Patricia Saunders661.41%
|
|
||
|Chris d'Entremont
|-
|bgcolor=whitesmoke|Chester-St. Margaret's
||
|Judy Streatch3,95042.67%
|
|Jane Matheson2,83330.60%
|
|Rick Fraughton2,19223.68%
|
|Joanne MacKinnon2823.05%
|
|
||
|Judy Streatch
|-
|bgcolor=whitesmoke|Lunenburg
||
|Michael Baker3,96949.40%
|
|Chris Heide2,66933.22%
|
|Rick Welsford1,20014.94%
|
|Stuart Simpson1962.44%
|
|
||
|Michael Baker
|-
|bgcolor=whitesmoke|Lunenburg West
||
|Carolyn Bolivar-Getson3,63743.21%
|
|Bill Smith3,29939.19%
|
|Martin Bell1,32415.73%
|
|Brendan MacNeill1571.87%
|
|
||
|Carolyn Bolivar-Getson
|-
|bgcolor=whitesmoke|Queens
|
|Kerry Morash2,99848.59%
||
|Vicki Conrad3,05349.48%
|
|
|
|Margaret Whitney1191.93%
|
|
||
|Kerry Morash
|-
|bgcolor=whitesmoke|Shelburne
|
|Eddie Nickerson2,35335.00%
||
|Sterling Belliveau2,43836.27%
|
|Kirk Cox1,79026.63%
|
|Derek Jones1412.10%
|
|
||
|Cecil O'Donnell†
|-
|bgcolor=whitesmoke|Yarmouth 
||
|Richard Hurlburt5,17064.30%
|
|John Deveau1,66720.73%
|
|Dolores Atwood1,05113.07%
|
|Matt Granger1521.89%
|
|
||
|Richard Hurlburt
|}

Fundy-Northeast

|-
|bgcolor=whitesmoke|Colchester-Musquodoboit Valley
||
|Brooke Taylor4,79063.85%
|
|Gary Burrill1,89125.21%
|
|Carolyn Matthews6578.76%
|
|Leona MacLeod1642.19%
|
|
||
|Brooke Taylor
|-
|bgcolor=whitesmoke|Colchester North
||
|Karen Casey3,80950.96%
|
|Rob Assels1,51120.21%
|
|Bob Taylor1,97926.47%
|
|Judy Davis1762.35%
|
|
||
|Bill Langille †
|-
|bgcolor=whitesmoke|Cumberland North
||
|Ernie Fage4,64062.64%
|
|Kim Cail1,08514.65%
|
|Bruce Alan Fage1,48019.98%
|
|Darryl Whetter2022.73%
|
|
||
|Ernie Fage
|-
|bgcolor=whitesmoke|Cumberland South
||
|Murray Scott5,08276.76%
|
|Andrew Kernohan75311.37%
|
|Mary Dee MacPherson68110.29%
|
|James Dessart921.39%
|
|David Raymond Amos130.20%
||
|Murray Scott
|-
|bgcolor=whitesmoke|Hants East
|
|Wayne Fiander2,71530.62%
||
|John MacDonell4,71253.13%
|
|Malcolm A. MacKay1,23713.95%
|
|Michael Hartlan2042.30%
|
|
||
|John MacDonell
|-
|bgcolor=whitesmoke|Truro-Bible Hill
||
|Jamie Muir3,71147.27%
|
|Jim Harpell2,24828.64%
|
|Ron Chisholm1,67421.32%
|
|Barton Cutten2172.76%
|
|
||
|Jamie Muir
|}

Central Halifax

|-
|bgcolor=whitesmoke|Halifax Chebucto
|
|Sean Phillips1,72022.09%
||
|Howard Epstein4,21654.15%
|
|Peter Verner1,48119.02%
|
|Christopher Harborne3694.74%
|
|
||
|Howard Epstein
|-
|bgcolor=whitesmoke|Halifax Citadel
|
|Bill Black2,72437.45%
||
|Leonard Preyra3,05442.03%
|
|Devin Maxwell1,18116.25%
|
|Nick Wright3074.23%
|
|
|
|Vacant
|-
|bgcolor=whitesmoke|Halifax Clayton Park
|
|Mary Ann McGrath2,45026.86%
|
|Linda Power3,04033.33%
||
|Diana Whalen3,40437.32%
|
|Sheila Richardson3073.37%
|
|
||
|Diana Whalen
|-
|bgcolor=whitesmoke|Halifax Fairview
|
|Bruce MacCharles1,64923.13%
||
|Graham Steele4,17258.51%
|
|Cecil MacDougall1,05514.80%
|
|Kris MacLellan2543.56%
|
|
||
|Graham Steele
|-
|bgcolor=whitesmoke|Halifax Needham
|
|Andrew Black1,33018.17%
||
|Maureen MacDonald4,43860.62%
|
|Errol Gaum1,22016.66%
|
|Amanda Myers3334.55%
|
|
||
|Maureen MacDonald
|}

Suburban Halifax

|-
|bgcolor=whitesmoke|Bedford
||
|Len Goucher4,09042.22%
|
|John Buckland2,01920.84%
|
|Francis MacKenzie3,28633.92%
|
|Mary McLaughlan2923.01%
|
|
||
|Peter G. Christie † 
|-
|bgcolor=whitesmoke|Halifax Atlantic
|
|Bruce Cooke2,69032.08%
||
|Michèle Raymond4,15149.51%
|
|Jim Hoskins1,28115.28%
|
|Rebecca Mosher2623.13%
|
|
||
|Michele Raymond
|-
|bgcolor=whitesmoke|Hammonds Plains-Upper Sackville
||
|Barry Barnet3,70442.02%
|
|Mat Whynott3,17836.05%
|
|Pam Streeter1,76620.03%
|
|Scott Cleghorn1671.89%
|
|
||
|Barry Barnet
|-
|bgcolor=whitesmoke|Sackville-Cobequid
|
|Steve Craig2,49930.42%
||
|Dave Wilson4,47754.50%
|
|David Major1,05112.80%
|
|Elizabeth Nicolson1872.28%
|
|
||
|Dave Wilson
|-
|bgcolor=whitesmoke|Timberlea-Prospect
|
|Jaunita Cirtwell2,03424.16%
||
|Bill Estabrooks5,31763.15%
|
|Lisa Mullin85110.11%
|
|Thomas Trappenberg2172.58%
|
|
||
|Bill Estabrooks
|-
|bgcolor=whitesmoke|Waverley-Fall River-Beaver Bank
|
|Gary Hines3,27540.17%
||
|Percy Paris3,78246.39%
|
|Thomas Deal90911.15%
|
|William Lang1862.28%
| 
|
||
|Gary Hines
|}

Dartmouth/Cole Harbour/Eastern Shore

|-
|bgcolor=whitesmoke|Cole Harbour 
|
|Sheila McKeand1,78820.63%
||
|Darrell Dexter5,32761.46%
|
|Stephen Beehan1,34715.54%
|
|Michael McFadden2062.38%
|
|
||
|Darrell Dexter
|-
|bgcolor=whitesmoke|Cole Harbour-Eastern Passage
|
|Don McIver1,20118.93%
||
|Kevin Deveaux4,08664.40%
|
|Brian Churchill90314.23%
|
|Beverly Woodfield1552.44%
|
|
||
|Kevin Deveaux
|-
|bgcolor=whitesmoke|Dartmouth East
|
|Jim Cormier2,94233.27%
||
|Joan Massey3,82243.22%
|
|Tracey Devereaux1,84220.83%
|
|Elizabeth Perry2382.69%
|
|
||
|Joan Massey
|-
|bgcolor=whitesmoke|Dartmouth North
|
|Troy Myers1,89527.46%
||
|Trevor Zinck3,41449.47%
|
|Ian Murray1,36519.78%
|
|Alex Donaldson2273.29%
|
|
||
|Jerry Pye† 
|-
|bgcolor=whitesmoke|Dartmouth South-Portland Valley
|
|Tim Olive3,04132.52%
||
|Marilyn More4,49348.05%
|
|Brian Hiltz1,50916.14%
|
|Daniel Melvin3083.29%
|
|
||
|Marilyn More
|-
|bgcolor=whitesmoke|Eastern Shore
||
|Bill Dooks3,23245.93%
|
|Sid Prest2,87140.80%
|
|Judith Cabrita74610.60%
|
|Elizabeth van Dreunen1882.67%
|
|
||
|Bill Dooks
|-
|bgcolor=whitesmoke|Preston
|
|Dwayne Provo1,62036.83%
|
|Douglas Sparks84319.17%
||
|Keith Colwell1,85342.13%
|
|David Farrell821.86%
|
|
||
|Keith Colwell
|}

Central Nova

|-
|bgcolor=whitesmoke|Antigonish 
||
|Angus MacIsaac4,62948.28%
|
|Andrew MacDonald1,82719.06%
|
|Danny MacIsaac2,95330.80%
|
|Judy Dowden1791.87%
|
|
||
|Angus MacIsaac
|-
|bgcolor=whitesmoke|Guysborough-Sheet Harbour
||
|Ron Chisholm2,76540.83%
|
|Jim Boudreau2,54037.51%
|
|David Horton1,37920.36%
|
|Marike Finlay-de Monchy881.30%
|
|
||
|Ron Chisholm
|-
|bgcolor=whitesmoke|Pictou Centre
||
|Pat Dunn3,90152.54%
|
|Danny MacGillivray2,35431.70%
|
|Troy MacCulloch1,05714.24%
|
|Samuel M. Clark931.25%
|
|Dennis Tate200.27%
||
|John Hamm†
|-
|bgcolor=whitesmoke|Pictou East
|
|Sue Uhren2,65435.31%
||
|Clarrie MacKinnon2,76136.73%
|
|Danny Walsh2,00026.61%
|
|John A. Clark1021.36%
|
|
||
|Jim DeWolfe†
|-
|bgcolor=whitesmoke|Pictou West
|
|Ronald Baillie2,58433.99%
||
|Charlie Parker4,17354.89%
|
|Sandy MacKay6989.18%
|
|Douglas Corbett1471.93%
|
|
||
|Charlie Parker
|}

Cape Breton

|-
|bgcolor=whitesmoke|Cape Breton Centre
|
|Darren Bruckschwaiger2,27428.44%
||
|Frank Corbett3,49043.65%
|
|Laura Lee MacDonald2,15226.92%
|
|Frances Oomen790.99%
|
|
||
|Frank Corbett
|-
|bgcolor=whitesmoke|Cape Breton North
||
|Cecil Clarke4,31050.71%
|
|Russell MacDonald2,19525.83%
|
|Fred Tilley1,86921.99%
|
|Mark Doucet1251.47%
|
|
||
|Cecil Clarke
|-
|bgcolor=whitesmoke|Cape Breton Nova
|
|Todd Marsman85512.07%
||
|Gordie Gosse4,31560.92%
|
|Mel Crowe1,79425.33%
|
|Chris Milburn1191.68%
|
|
||
|Gordie Gosse
|-
|bgcolor=whitesmoke|Cape Breton South
|
|Scott Boyd3,26132.36%
|
|Jamie Crane2,16021.43%
||
|Manning MacDonald4,38343.50%
|
|Stephen Doucet2732.71%
|
|
||
|Manning MacDonald
|-
|bgcolor=whitesmoke|Cape Breton West
||
|Alfie MacLeod4,72953.76%
|
|Terry Crawley1,34415.28%
|
|Dave LeBlanc2,48828.28%
|
|Michael Milburn2362.68%
|
|
||
|Russell MacKinnon†
|-
|bgcolor=whitesmoke|Glace Bay
|
|Mark Bettens2,07426.85%
|
|Myrtle Campbell2,23428.93%
||
|David Wilson3,32743.08%
|
|Todd Pettigrew881.14%
|
|
||
|Dave Wilson
|-
|bgcolor=whitesmoke|Inverness
||
|Rodney MacDonald7,40470.47%
|
|Tim Murphy1,34212.77%
|
|Mary MacLennan1,62715.49%
|
|John Gibson1331.27%
|
|
||
|Rodney MacDonald
|-
|bgcolor=whitesmoke|Richmond
|
|John Greene2,26840.45%
|
|Mary Pat Cude5299.43%
||
|Michel Samson2,72248.55%
|
|Noreen Hartlen881.57%
|
|
||
|Michel Samson
|-
|bgcolor=whitesmoke|Victoria-The Lakes
||
|Keith Bain3,00147.48%
|
|Joan O'Liari75511.94%
|
|Gerald Sampson2,27235.94%
|
|Michelle Smith1732.74%
|
|Stemer MacLeod1201.90%
||
|Gerald Sampson
|}

Opinion polls
A March 2006 poll by Corporate Research Associates asked voters who they would prefer as premier, 36 per cent of respondents picked Premier Rodney MacDonald, compared to 23 per cent for Darrell Dexter and 16 per cent for Francis MacKenzie. The same poll showed the Progressive Conservatives in the lead with 36 percent of voters compared to 29 percent for the New Democrats and 27 percent for the Liberals.

Notes

References

Further reading

External links
CBC: Nova Scotia Votes 2006

2006 elections in Canada
2006
Election
June 2006 events in Canada